The SC Neukirchen is a German association football club from the city of Neukirchen, Hesse.

History
The actual foundation date of the club is shrouded in mystery but the club decided in 1945 that 1899 seemed the most likely year. The local gymnastics club, a predecessor of the SCN dates back to 1864 but the current club does not claim this as its foundation year.

The club did not rise above local amateur level until 1984, when it won promotion to the Landesliga Hessen-Nord, one of the three fourth-tier leagues in Hesse at the time. The SCN became an instant success in this league, finishing in the top-five for the next five seasons. In the 1989–90 seasons, it had to struggle, finishing only 12th but still well clear of the relegation places. After this laps, it returned to its old ways in 1990–91, coming third and won its league the season after.

Promoted to the Oberliga Hessen for the first time in 1992, it had two seasons in mid-table before winning the championship in Hesse's highest amateur league. Promotion to the Regionalliga Süd (III) was the reward for this.

The club held out for four seasons in the third division, earning a ninth-place finish in 1996–97 as its best result. After this, it declined and, coming last in 1999, was relegated back down again.

A second place in its first year back in the Oberliga was followed by a gradual decline. After the 2002–03 season, where an eleventh place would have meant survival, the club was forced to withdraw from the league for financial reasons. The SCN stepped down from tier-four straight to tier seven, entering the Bezirksliga Kassel for the 2003–04 seasons.

It struggled to find its footing in lower amateur football, suffering another relegation but soon recovered to climb the ranks again. In 2007, it won promotion to the tier six Bezirksoberliga, which became the Gruppenliga the following year. SCN lasted for four seasons at this level before suffering relegation in 2011.

Honours
The club's honours:

League
 Oberliga Hessen (IV) 
 Champions: 1995
 Runners-up: 2000
 Landesliga Hessen-Nord (IV) 
 Champions: 1992

Cup
 Hesse Cup 
 Winners: 1985, 1995, 1997
 Runners-up: 1991, 1996, 1998, 2002

Recent seasons
The recent season-by-season performance of the club:

 With the introduction of the Regionalligas in 1994 and the 3. Liga in 2008 as the new third tier, below the 2. Bundesliga, all leagues below dropped one tier. Also in 2008, a large number of football leagues in Hesse were renamed, with the Oberliga Hessen becoming the Hessenliga, the Landesliga becoming the Verbandsliga, the Bezirksoberliga becoming the Gruppenliga and the Bezirksliga becoming the Kreisoberliga.

Cup success
The club has taken out the Hesse Cup three times in its history, qualifying thereby for the German Cup, where it never went past the first round yet despite having home games each time:
 DFB Cup 1985–86: lost to Borussia Dortmund 2–9
 DFB Cup 1991–92: lost to Hallescher FC 0–3
 DFB Cup 1995–96: lost to 1. FSV Mainz 05 2–2 / 5–6 after penalties
 DFB Cup 1997–98: lost to KFC Uerdingen 05 0–2

References

External links 
Official team site
Abseits Guide to German Soccer – SC Neukirchen
Das deutsche Fußball-Archiv historical German domestic league tables 

Football clubs in Germany
Football clubs in Hesse
Association football clubs established in 1899
1899 establishments in Germany